Kim Jong (born 19 April 1989, South Hamgyong Province) is a North Korean table tennis player. She competed for North Korea at the 2008 and 2012 Summer Olympics. At the 2008 Olympics she competed in the women's singles only, and at the 2012 Summer Olympics she competed in the women's singles and the women's team events.  She won gold medals in mixed doubles events with Kim Hyok-bong at the 2013 World Championships and the 2014 Asian Games.

Kim represents the April 25 Sports Team.

References

External links
 

North Korean female table tennis players
Table tennis players at the 2008 Summer Olympics
Table tennis players at the 2012 Summer Olympics
Olympic table tennis players of North Korea
1989 births
Living people
Asian Games medalists in table tennis
Table tennis players at the 2006 Asian Games
Table tennis players at the 2010 Asian Games
Table tennis players at the 2014 Asian Games
Asian Games gold medalists for North Korea
Asian Games bronze medalists for North Korea
Medalists at the 2006 Asian Games
Medalists at the 2010 Asian Games
Medalists at the 2014 Asian Games
World Table Tennis Championships medalists
21st-century North Korean women